Mosaic Select: Toshiko Akiyoshi – Lew Tabackin Big Band is a 3 CD compilation album released by Mosaic Records in October 2008 and is composed of the first five studio albums recorded by the LA-based Toshiko Akiyoshi – Lew Tabackin Big Band.  It is volume 33 of the "Mosaic Select" series and includes the complete contents of the previously released RCA / Victor recordings, Kogun (1974), Long Yellow Road (1975), Tales of a Courtesan (Oirantan) (1976), Insights (1976), and March of the Tadpoles (1977).

Track listing
All songs orchestrated by Toshiko Akiyoshi.  All songs composed by Akiyoshi except "Yet Another Tear" (Tabackin).

Disc One:
"Elegy" – 9:10
"Memory" – 10:23
"Kogun" – 6:06
"American Ballad" – 5:46
"Henpecked Old Man" – 9:11
"Long Yellow Road" – 6:23
"The First Night" – 4:50
"Opus No. Zero" – 10:04
"Quadrille, Anyone?" – 6:18
"Children in the Temple Ground" – 5:26

Disc Two  
"Since Perry" / "Yet Another Tear" – 8:52
"Road Time Shuffle" – 6:25
"Tales of a Courtesan (Oirantan)" – 9:09
"Strive for Jive" – 7:46
"I Ain't Gonna Ask No More" – 6:06
"Interlude" – 4:13
"Village" – 11:04
"Studio J" – 6:00
"Transience" – 4:33
"Sumi-E" – 7:50

Disc Three:    
"Minamata" (suite) – 21:37
"Peaceful Village"
"Prosperity & Consequence"
"Epilogue"
"March of the Tadpoles" – 6:54
"Mobile" – 5:20
"Deracinated Flower" – 8:14
"Yellow is Mellow" –  8:53
"Notorious Tourist from the East" –  7:35

Personnel
Toshiko Akiyoshi – piano
Lew Tabackin – tenor saxophone, flute, piccolo
Tom Peterson – tenor saxophone, alto flute, clarinet
Dick Spencer – alto saxophone, flute, clarinet
Gary Foster – alto saxophone, soprano saxophone, flute, clarinet (except "Opus No. Zero")
Bill Perkins – baritone saxophone, alto flute, bass clarinet
Joe Roccisano – alto saxophone ("Opus No. Zero")
Bobby Shew – trumpet
Mike Price – trumpet
Steven Huffsteter – trumpet ("Road Time Shuffle", "Tales of a Courtesan (Oirantan)", "Strive for Jive", "I Ain't Gonna Ask No More", "Interlude", "Village", "Studio J", "Transience", "Sumi-E", "Minamata", "March of the Tadpoles", "Mobile", "Deracinated Flower", "Yellow is Mellow" and "Notorious Tourist from the East")
Richard Cooper – trumpet ("Road Time Shuffle", "Tales of a Courtesan (Oirantan)", "Strive for Jive", "I Ain't Gonna Ask No More", "Interlude", "Village", "Studio J", "Transience", "Sumi-E", "March of the Tadpoles", "Mobile", "Deracinated Flower", "Yellow is Mellow" and "Notorious Tourist from the East")
Don Rader – trumpet  ("Elegy", "Memory", "Kogun", "American Ballad", "Henpecked Old Man", "Long Yellow Road", "The First Night", "Opus Number Zero", "Quadrille Anyone?", "Children in the Temple Ground", "Since Perry" / "Yet Another Tear")
Stu Blumberg – trumpet ("The First Night", "Opus Number Zero", "Children in the Temple Ground")
John Madrid – trumpet ("Elegy", "Memory", "Kogun", "American Ballad", "Henpecked Old Man" and "Long Yellow Road")
Lynn Nicholson – trumpet ("Quadrille Anyone?", "Since Perry" / "Yet Another Tear")
Jerry Hey – trumpet ("Minamata")
Phil Teele – bass trombone
Charlie Loper – trombone
Britt Woodman – trombone (except "March of the Tadpoles", "Mobile", "Deracinated Flower", "Yellow is Mellow" and "Notorious Tourist from the East")
Bill Reichenbach Jr. – trombone ("Road Time Shuffle", "Tales of a Courtesan", "I Ain't Gonna Ask No More", "Interlude", "Studio J", "Transience", "Sumi-E", "Minamata", "March of the Tadpoles", "Mobile", "Deracinated Flower", "Yellow is Mellow" and "Notorious Tourist from the East")
Jim Sawyer – trombone ("Elegy", "Memory", "Kogun", "American Ballad", "Henpecked Old Man", "Long Yellow Road", "Strive for Jive" and "Village")
Bruce Paulson – trombone ("The First Night", "Opus Number Zero", "Quadrille Anyone?", "Children in the Temple Ground", "Since Perry" / "Yet Another Tear")
Rick Culver – trombone ("March of the Tadpoles", "Mobile", "Deracinated Flower", "Yellow is Mellow" and "Notorious Tourist from the East")
Peter Donald – drums (except "Opus Number Zero" and "Since Perry" / "Yet Another Tear")
Chuck Flores – drums ("Opus Number Zero" and "Since Perry" / "Yet Another Tear")
Don Baldwin – bass ("Road Time Shuffle", "Tales of a Courtesan", "Strive for Jive", "I Ain't Gonna Ask No More", "Interlude", "Village", "Studio J", "Transience", "Sumi-E", "Minamata", "March of the Tadpoles", "Mobile", "Deracinated Flower", "Yellow is Mellow" and "Notorious Tourist from the East")
Gene Cherico – bass ("Elegy", "Memory", "Kogun", "American Ballad", "Henpecked Old Man", "Long Yellow Road", "The First Night", "Opus Number Zero", "Quadrille Anyone?", "Children in the Temple Ground" and "Since Perry" / "Yet Another Tear")

Special guests:
Scott Elsworth – voice ("Memory")
Tokuko Kaga – vocal ("Children in the Temple Ground")
King Errisson – congas ("Village")
Hisao Kanze – utai / Nō chant ("Minamata")
Tadao Kamei – ōtsuzumi ("Minamata")
Hayao Uzawa – kotsuzumi ("Minamata")
(Monday) Michiru Mariano – voice ("Minamata")
Hiromitsu Katada – kakko ("Sumi-E")
Emil Richards – percussion ("Notorious Tourist from the East")

Sources / References
Mosaic Select MS-033, Mosaic Records
Mosaic Select 33, Toshiko Akiyoshi - Lew Tabackin Big Band at [ Allmusic.com]

Toshiko Akiyoshi – Lew Tabackin Big Band albums
2008 compilation albums